Niklas Oskar Bäckström (born 13 February 1978) is a Finnish former professional ice hockey goaltender and current goaltending coach for the Columbus Blue Jackets. He played ten seasons for the Minnesota Wild and Calgary Flames in the National Hockey League (NHL), during which he won both the William M. Jennings Trophy and Roger Crozier Saving Grace Award. He also has won both Urpo Ylönen trophy and Jari Kurri trophy twice. Bäckström is a Swedish-speaking Finn, but also speaks Finnish.

Playing career

Finland 
Bäckström won the 1998 World Junior Ice Hockey Championships as a backup goaltender for the Finnish national team, along with players like Olli Jokinen, Niklas Hagman, Mika Noronen, Niko Kapanen, Toni Dahlman and Eero Somervuori. Bäckström was the third goaltender for Finland in the 2006 Winter Olympics in Turin, but did not play any games. In the Finnish SM-liiga, he played for HIFK, SaiPa and Kärpät. Bäckström led Kärpät to two consecutive league titles in 2004 and 2005. Subsequently, Bäckström signed a one-year contract with the Minnesota Wild of the NHL on 1 June 2006.

Minnesota Wild 
At the beginning of the 2006–07 season, Bäckström was the backup for the Wild's starting goaltender, Manny Fernandez. He made his NHL debut on 7 October 2006, notching his first career win in a 6–5 victory over the Nashville Predators. In his seventh career game, Bäckström continued to impress in recording his first career shutout in a 4–0 victory over the Phoenix Coyotes on 24 November 2006. After Fernandez suffered a knee injury mid-season, Bäckström was forced into the starter's position. He played exceptionally well over the second half of the season, finishing first in the NHL in both goals against average (GAA) and save percentage, while tying Dwayne Roloson's team record with 5 shutouts in just 36 starts.

Upon the trade of Fernandez to the Boston Bruins in 2007, Bäckström became Minnesota's starting goaltender. He recorded 33 wins in the 2007–08 season and was the starter for Minnesota's first round Stanley Cup playoff series against the Colorado Avalanche, which Colorado won in six games.

Though he was due to become an unrestricted free agent on 1 July 2009, Bäckström signed a four-year, $24 million contract on 3 March 2009, to remain with the Wild. Despite Bäckström's 37 wins and strong goaltending, the Wild ultimately did not qualify for the playoffs in 2009. In that season, Bäckström finished as the runner-up for the Vezina Trophy, awarded to the NHL's top goaltender. In 2012, Bäckström played very well in the first half the season and the Wild had a chance to make the playoffs. However, in the second half of the season, Bäckström slumped and suffered injuries as the Wild failed to make the playoffs.

In the following seasons, Bäckström played on-and-off with the additions of goaltenders Ilya Bryzgalov, Darcy Kuemper and Devan Dubnyk to the Wild. In the 2015–16 season, he was often a healthy scratch as Kuemper dressed as Dubnyk's backup.

Calgary Flames 
Having yet to appear in a competitive game with the Wild in the 2015–16 season, on 29 February 2016, Bäckström was traded to the Calgary Flames (along with a draft pick in the 2016 NHL Entry Draft) in exchange for forward David Jones. He appeared in four games for the Flames, recording two wins and two losses.

Return to Finland 
On 10 June 2016, Bäckström effectively ended his NHL career after signing, as an impending free agent, a one-year contract with former club HIFK in Finland.

In May 2018, Bäckström signed a one-year contract with Tappara.

Personal life
Bäckström and his wife Heidi have two children: Benjamin and Isabella.

Records

Minnesota Wild
 Most wins: 194
 Most shutouts in a season: 8 (2008–09)

Career statistics

Regular season and playoffs

International

Awards

References

External links

 

1978 births
Ice hockey people from Helsinki
Swedish-speaking Finns
AIK IF players
Calgary Flames players
Finnish ice hockey goaltenders
Finnish expatriate ice hockey players in the United States
HIFK (ice hockey) players
Ice hockey players at the 2006 Winter Olympics
Ice hockey players at the 2010 Winter Olympics
Living people
Oulun Kärpät players
Minnesota Wild players
Medalists at the 2010 Winter Olympics
Medalists at the 2006 Winter Olympics
National Hockey League All-Stars
Olympic bronze medalists for Finland
Olympic ice hockey players of Finland
Olympic medalists in ice hockey
Olympic silver medalists for Finland
SaiPa players
Tappara players
Undrafted National Hockey League players
William M. Jennings Trophy winners
Finnish expatriate ice hockey players in Sweden
Finnish expatriate ice hockey players in Canada